The Xiaomi Mi4i (Chinese: 小米手机4i) is a smartphone developed by Xiaomi Inc. It is part of Xiaomi's mid-range smartphone line, and was released in April 2015. Xiaomi held a media event in Siri Fort Auditorium, Delhi to formally introduce the mid-range phone, and also supplied its fans with their complementary smart-accessory, the Xiaomi MiBand, during the Xiaomi New Product Launch Event 2015 on April 23, 2015.

The Mi4i is a slightly bumped down version of its predecessor, the Xiaomi Mi4. The phone has a different design than its predecessor and has a polycarbonate body. It was also released with the new MIUI 6 (introduced in August 2014) based on Android Lollipop.

Reception towards the device was generally positive, though there were still a high amount of negative feedback from users of Apple's iPhone 5C due to its similar design and quality. Some media companies hailed it to be one of the best smartphones available in the market due to its high-end hardware which is sold for comparably lower price than its competitors.

History 
Before its official unveiling, media speculation primarily focused on leaks; including photos that announced the Mi4i. While the device was announced on April 23, it didn't become available until April 30, running MIUI 6 (Android Lollipop
Xiaomi launched the Mi4i specifically in India first and plans to expand sales throughout Asia.

Features

Operating system and software 

The Xiaomi Mi 4i ships with MIUI V7 and can be upgraded to MIUI V8, Xiaomi's variant of the Android operating system. The user interface of MIUI is based on the concept of direct manipulation, using multi-touch gestures. Interface control elements consist of sliders, switches, and buttons. Interaction with the OS includes gestures such as swipe, tap, pinch and reverse pinch, all of which have specific definitions within the context of the Android operating system and its multi-touch interface. Internal accelerometers are used by some applications to respond to the movement of the device such as rotating it vertically (one common result is switching from portrait to landscape mode). The device includes an updater application which allows it to update its OS to the latest version of MIUI available for it.

Design 
The device has a 5 in (12.7 cm) Sharp/JDI Corning OGS fully laminated touchscreen, with a screen resolution of 1080x1920 at a pixel density of 441 ppi.  Home button of the smartphone is similar to its predecessor and is mainly touch-based with adjustable haptic feedback. It is available in different colors including Dark Gray, Yellow, Black, White, Blue and Pink.

Hardware 
The Xiaomi Mi 4i is powered by a Qualcomm Snapdragon 615 (MSM8939) chipset which makes it a fast enough Android smartphone according to the AnTuTu benchmark application. Its processor is an Octa-core 1.7 GHz and 1.1 GHz and its graphics card is an Adreno 405. The phone includes a 3120 mAh battery which is rated to provide 300 hours of standby time. It comes with a 13 megapixel primary camera and a 5 megapixel secondary camera.

See also 
 Comparison of smartphones

References

External links 
  – Mi India official site

Android (operating system) devices
Mobile phones introduced in 2015
Mi 4i
Discontinued smartphones